Podabrus is a genus of soldier beetles in the family Cantharidae. There are at least 110 described species in Podabrus, recorded from Europe, North America and Asia.

Many Podabrus appear to mimic fireflies, such as the winter firefly.

See also
 List of Podabrus species

References

Further reading

External links

 

Cantharidae
Articles created by Qbugbot